The Plantain River (French: Rivière Plantain) is a tributary of the Gulf of Saint Lawrence, flowing in the municipality of L'Île-d'Anticosti, in the Minganie Regional County Municipality, in the administrative region of Côte-Nord, in province of Quebec, in Canada.

The Plantain River is the westernmost river on Anticosti Island.

Geography 
The Plantain River has its source at Lake Superior located at the western end of Anticosti Island. The mouth of Lake Superior is located at the end of the bay on the west shore, at:
  northeast of Pointe-Ouest of Anticosti Island;
  north-west of the town centre of the village of Port-Menier;
  south-east of the north shore of Anticosti Island.

From its source, the Plantain River flows south between the western end of Anticosti Island and the Gamache River (located on the east side).

  first southwest, then southeast across Plantain Lake, up to its mouth;
  towards the south-east, crossing areas of marshes and collecting the Diane stream (coming from the north-east), until its mouth.

The Plantain River flows into the Gulf of Saint Lawrence, via Jolliet Bay which has a width:  at the entrance to the bay, that is to say at the height of the Pointe of the castle. Jolliet bay turns out to be a sub-element of Gamache bay (width:  at the entrance to the bay), on the shore south of Anticosti Island. At low tide, the sandstone at the mouth of the Plantain River can stretch as far as  towards the centre of the bay.

Gamache bay includes Jolliet bay (located to the northwest) and Navots bay (located to the northeast).

Toponymy 
The toponymic designation "rivière Plantain" appears in a volume published in 1904 and also in 1924 in the Bulletin de la Société de Géographie de Québec.

The toponym "Rivière Plantain" was made official on December 5, 1968.

See also 

 List of rivers of Quebec

References 

 

Rivers of Côte-Nord
Anticosti Island
Minganie Regional County Municipality